Abu Hammad orthonairovirus, also called Abu Hammad virus (AHV), is a species of virus in the genus Orthonairovirus. It was isolated from a tick, Argas hermanni, in Egypt. This virus doesn't cause disease in humans.

Abu Hammad virus shares an intergroup relationship with viruses of serogroups (CHF-CON, HUG, NSD, QYB, and SAK), all of which make up the Nairovirus genus.

References 

Nairoviridae